Rudbal or Rud Bal may refer to:
 Rudbal, Firuzabad, Fars Province
 Rudbal, Sepidan, Fars Province
 Rudbal, Kohgiluyeh and Boyer-Ahmad
 Rudbal Rural District, in Fars Province